This is a list of notable past and present residents of the U.S. city of Scottsdale, Arizona.

Athletics

Max Aaron (born 1992) – 2013 National Champion at the U.S. Figure Skating Championships
Chance Adams (born 1994) - professional baseball player
Muhammad Ali – heavyweight champion boxer
Brian Bannister – professional baseball pitcher
Charles Barkley (born 1963) – basketball player for Philadelphia 76ers, Phoenix Suns, and Houston Rockets, also TV commentator
Chad Beyer – professional cyclist
Amanda Blumenherst (born 1986) – professional golfer
Pat Burrell – professional baseball player
Jocko Conlan, Hall of Fame baseball umpire
Danny Curzon – pairs figure skater
Ike Davis (born 1987) - professional baseball player for New York Mets
Robelyn Garcia – professional basketball player, professor
Luis Gonzalez – professional baseball player
Mark Grace – professional baseball player
Chelsi Guillen – pairs figure skater
Max Homa (born 1990) – professional golfer on the PGA Tour 
Helen Hull Jacobs – champion tennis player
Ruth Jessen – professional golfer
Jakob Junis (born 1992) - baseball pitcher for the San Francisco Giants
Paul Konerko – professional baseball player
Tom Lehman – professional golfer
Meadowlark Lemon – basketball player for the Harlem Globetrotters
Kevin Long – professional baseball coach
Auston Matthews – professional ice hockey player
Jim Palmer – professional baseball pitcher, member MLB Hall of Fame
Mike Pollak – professional football player
Jeremy Roenick – professional hockey player
Matisse Thybulle (born 1997) - professional basketball player
Brady Tkachuk – professional hockey player
Matthew Tkachuk – professional hockey player
 Jeremy Wolf (born 1993) - American-Israeli baseball player on the Israel National Baseball Team
 Jesse Ylönen – professional hockey player

Entertainment

Erika Alexander – actress
Rex Allen – actor, singer and songwriter
Jules Asner – actress, model
Brie Bella - wrestling WWE
Nikki Bella - wrestling WWE
Sandra Bernhard – actress, comedian
Drew Binsky - travel vlogger and blogger
Lynda Carter – actress, title role on Wonder Woman
Joan Ganz Cooney – producer, founder of Children's Television Workshop
Brady Corbet – actor
Andy Devine – actor
Barbara Eden – actress
Dennis Farina – actor
Kade Gottlieb – also known as Gottmik, drag queen, television personality, Rupaul's Drag Race
Gregg Groothuis – professional wrestler
Sammi Hanratty – actress
Barbara Harris – actress
Dale Hellestrae – professional football player
Catherine Hicks – actress
Kalani Hilliker – dancer, reality television personality, Dance Moms, Abby's Ultimate Dance Competition
Earl Hindman – actor
Jenna Jameson – porn star
Brad Johnson – actor, model
Marilyn Kagan - actress, psychotherapist 
Tanner Maguire – actor
Frankie Muniz – actor
Tyler Niknam – Twitch streamer
David Spade – actor
Steven Spielberg – Oscar-winning film director
Emma Stone – Oscar-winning actress
Dick Van Dyke – actor, The Dick Van Dyke Show, Mary Poppins
Sofia Wylie – actress, singer, and dancer, Andi Mack

Music

Billy Preston - singer (died in Scottsdale)
Dierks Bentley – singer
David Ellefson – musician
Joseph Adam Jonas – singer, part of the Jonas Brothers
Nils Lofgren – musician, songwriter
Bret Michaels – singer/songwriter, musician, member of Poison
Stevie Nicks – singer
Jerry Riopelle – musician, record producer
The Summer Set – pop rock band
Chronic Future – alternative rock band

Literature

Diana Gabaldon – author of the Outlander series
Elisabeth Kübler-Ross – author
Stephenie Meyer – author of the Twilight series
Barbara Park – author of children's books

Politics

Cesar Estrada Chavez – political activist
Barry Goldwater – former U.S. Senator and 1964 presidential candidate
G. Gordon Liddy – Watergate Scandal, chief operationist
John McCain – former U.S. Senator and 2000 and 2008 presidential candidate
Sandra Day O'Connor – U.S. Supreme Court Justice

Miscellaneous

Ron Evans – astronaut
 Kevin Geary (born 1952) – English portrait and abstract artist
Hadas Gold (born 1988) – media and business reporter 
Jacob Gold – financial planner
Frank Luke – fighter ace of World War I
Bob Parsons – entrepreneur, founder of Go Daddy
Frank Lloyd Wright – architect

References 

Scottsdale